There is a sizable community of around 80,000 Americans living in Saudi Arabia, one of the largest population of the United States nationals in the Arab world. Most work in the oil industry and in the construction and financial sectors. Westerners, including Americans, move here for tax-free salaries and live in housing compounds with luxurious amenities, such as swimming pools and tennis courts, which are sealed off from surrounding neighborhoods by high walls and gates which give Americans "some security and privacy from the country's strict Islamic code on matters of dress and social mixing."

The largest American community are in the capital of Riyadh, the headquarters of most multinational corporations in the kingdom, and in the Red Sea port city of Jeddah, a major commercial center. There are smaller American communities in the eastern cities of Dammam, Khobar and Dhahran, serving the local oil fields. Saudi Arabia also has some 5,000 U.S. military personnel.

See also
Saudi Arabia–United States relations
Emigration from the United States
Saudi Americans

References

American diaspora in Asia
Ethnic groups in Saudi Arabia
Saudi Arabia
Saudi Arabia–United States relations